The 2021–22 FAW Welsh Cup was the 134rd season of the annual knockout tournament for competitive football teams in Wales. The New Saints were the competition's winners, the eighth time they had triumphed.

Changes to the competition
Ahead of the first matches of the cup, the Football Association of Wales announced that for the 2021–22 season there would the following changes:

There will no longer be any extra-time with matches ending in a tie going straight to a penalty shoot-out;
An extended Round of 64 will be been introduced, meaning that Round 2 will see all twelve Cymru Premier clubs directly enter the competition alongside half of the Tier 2 clubs who did not enter in the Round 1 stage;
Introduction of a seeding system for Round 2 to encourage more encounters between larger and smaller clubs;
Changes to prize money awarded which will award money to all clubs winning matches from the start of the tournament including qualifying rounds;
Introduction of a coefficient ranking system to assist with byes and seeding in future editions of the cup.

First qualifying round
The first qualifying round matches were announced on 11 June and played on 9 and 10 July.

North

|-
!colspan="3" align="center"|Match date
|-
!colspan="3" align="center"|9 July

|-
!colspan="3" align="center"|10 July

|}

Central

|-
!colspan="3" align="center"|Match date
|-
!colspan="3" align="center"|10 July

|}

South

|-
!colspan="3" align="center"|Match date
|-
!colspan="3" align="center"|9 July

|-
!colspan="3" align="center"|10 July

|}

Notes

Second qualifying round
The draw for the second qualifying round was made on 12 July 2021 and the matches were played on 23 and 24 July.

North

|-
!colspan="3" align="center"|Match date
|-
!colspan="3" align="center"|23 July

|-
!colspan="3" align="center"|24 July

|}

Notes

Central

|-
!colspan="3" align="center"|Match date
|-
!colspan="3" align="center"|24 July

|}

Notes

South

|-
!colspan="3" align="center"|Match date
|-
!colspan="3" align="center"|23 July

|-
!colspan="3" align="center"|24 July

|}

Notes

First round
The draw for the first round, which took place on 26 July,  saw 8 clubs from the Cymru North and 8 from the Cymru South join the competition. Matches took place on 13, 14 and 15 August.

Northern

|-
!colspan="3" align="center"|Match date
|-
!colspan="3" align="center"|13 August

|-
!colspan="3" align="center"|14 August

|}

Notes

Southern

|-
!colspan="3" align="center"|Match date
|-
!colspan="3" align="center"|13 August

|-
!colspan="3" align="center"|14 August

|}

Notes

Second round
The second round of the competition saw the remaining eight clubs from each of the Cymru North and Cymru South, as well as all 12 Cymru Premier clubs join the competition. The draw took place on 16 August with ties played on 3 and 4 September 2021.

Six clubs from tier four remained at the start of this round of the competition as the lowest ranked clubs, but all were eliminated by clubs from higher divisions. Bala Town's 17–1 victory over Brymbo equalled the record for the biggest margin of victory in a Welsh Cup tie.

Northern

|-
!colspan="3" align="center"|Match date
|-
!colspan="3" align="center"|3 September

|-
!colspan="3" align="center"|4 September

|}

Notes

Southern

|-
!colspan="3" align="center"|Match date
|-
!colspan="3" align="center"|3 September

|-
!colspan="3" align="center"|4 September

|}

Notes

Third round
The draw took place on 6 September with ties played on 24 and 25 September 2021. Four clubs from tier three progressed from round two as the lowest ranked remaining clubs, with three of them gaining home ties.

|-
!colspan="3" align="center"|Match date
|-
!colspan="3" align="center"|24 September

|-
!colspan="3" align="center"|25 September

|}

Notes

Fourth round
The draw took place on 27 September. Saltney Town, the only remaining club from the Ardal Leagues (tier 3), were drawn at home to Cymru Premier side Aberystwyth Town.  Ties were played on 15 and 16 October 2021. The upset of the round was Colwyn Bay's defeat of higher league Cardiff Metropolitan University.

|-
!colspan="3" align="center"|Match date

|-
!colspan="3" align="center"|15 October

|-
!colspan="3" align="center"|16 October

|}

Notes

Quarter-finals
The quarter-final draw took place on 18 October with matches played on 19 February 2022. Colwyn Bay was the only non-Cymru Premier side to advance after beating Cymru Premier champions Connah's Quay Nomads 2–0 away.

Notes

Semi-finals
The draw took place on 21 February. Semi-final ties will be played at neutral venues on 18 and 20 March 2022. The match dates and venues were announced on 4 March. The first semi saw Penybont reach their first Welsh Cup final, beating Bala Town on penalties whilst the second saw the recently confirmed Cymru Premier champions The New Saints beat Colwyn Bay 1–0.

Notes

Final
The final was played on 1 May 2022 at the Cardiff City Stadium. The New Saints won the competition for the eighth time, going three goals up with two scored by Jordan Williams before Penybont scored two goals in the final five minutes of the match.

Notes

References

2021-22
2021–22 European domestic association football cups
Cup